Little Houghton is a village and civil parish in Northamptonshire, England, located about  east of Northampton. At the time of the 2001 census, the parish's population was 367 people, increasing to 412 at the 2011 census.

The villages name means 'hill-spur farm/settlement'.

The Church of England parish church is dedicated to St Mary the Virgin.

Just off the A428 road between Bedford and Northampton, the village overlooks old gravel pits, (now converted to reservoirs) and a canal. Just across the valley is Billing Aquadrome.

In the village is Little Houghton House a Grade II-Listed Manor House with roots back to 1685.

To the north at Clifford Hill by the river Nene is the surviving motte of Little Houghton Castle.

References

External links

Villages in Northamptonshire
West Northamptonshire District
Civil parishes in Northamptonshire